Neurocordulia michaeli, the broad-tailed shadowdragon, is a species of dragonfly in the family Corduliidae. It is found in Canada and the United States. Its natural habitat is rivers.

References

Corduliidae
Taxonomy articles created by Polbot
Insects described in 2000